Digital violence can refer to:

 violence in computer games
 disruptive actions online, such as cyber-bullying or cyberwarfare